The IHF Women's Junior World Championship is the official competition for women's national handball teams under-20, has been organized by the International Handball Federation since 1977. It takes place every two years in even years.

Tournaments

Medal table

Participating nations

See also
 Youth European Championship 
 Youth World Championship
 Junior European Championship

References

External links
 Women's Junior WC at IHF

Women's handball competitions
 
Junior